The King's Medal for Service in the Cause of Freedom is a British medal instituted by King George VI on 23 August 1945. It was awarded to civilian foreign nationals, mainly of allied countries, who had given meritorious service to further the interests of the British Commonwealth or the Allied cause during World War II. Activities recognised included fund raising for British war relief, scientific research that aided the war effort and organising ambulance services. The medal was awarded 2,539 times.

The obverse bears the left facing crowned effigy of King George VI with the inscription 'GEORGIVS VI D:G:BR:OMN:REX ET INDIAE IMP'. The reverse shows a medieval warrior in armour carrying a broken lance, being offered sustenance by a woman. The upper circumference is inscribed 'FOR SERVICE IN THE CAUSE OF FREEDOM', with 'THE KINGS MEDAL' below. The medal was awarded unnamed.

The medal has a ring suspension.

Those who helped British military personnel to escape the enemy, return from occupied areas or for other dangerous work for the British or Allied cause during the war were eligible for the King's Medal for Courage in the Cause of Freedom.

Notable recipients

 Grace Macurdy (1866-1946). Awarded in 1946 for her role in Greek and British war relief.
 John G. Trump (1907-1985). Awarded in 1947 for his research and creation of radar detection technology used during World War II.
 Ann Wood-Kelly (1918-2006). Awarded in 1946 for her service as a ferry pilot with the British Air Transport Auxiliary, she delivering to airfields more than 900 new and repaired aircraft of 75 different types.

References

Civil awards and decorations of the United Kingdom
Awards established in 1945
Military awards and decorations of World War II